Leslie Whittle Irving (20 October 1904 – 27 September 1973) was an Australian rules footballer who played with Essendon in the Victorian Football League (VFL).

Notes

External links 
		

1904 births
1973 deaths
Australian rules footballers from Victoria (Australia)
Essendon Football Club players